James Kyriakides (born 20 March 1991) is a Welsh field hockey player. He is the older brother of Daniel Kyriakides.

He represented Wales in the 2014 Commonwealth Games in Glasgow. James also represented Wales at the 2018 Gold Coast Commonwealth Games

He currently plays club hockey for Southgate Hockey Club in the Men's England Hockey League.

References

Living people
Welsh male field hockey players
Field hockey players at the 2014 Commonwealth Games
Commonwealth Games competitors for Wales
1991 births
Southgate Hockey Club players
Men's England Hockey League players